The 2018 United States Senate elections were held on November 6, 2018. Among the 100 seats, the 33 of Class 1 were contested in regular elections while two others were contested in special elections due to Senate vacancies in Minnesota and Mississippi. The winners were elected to six-year terms running from January 3, 2019, to January 3, 2025. Senate Democrats had 26 seats up for election (including the seats of two independents who caucus with them), while Senate Republicans had nine seats up for election.

To maintain their working majority of 50 senators and their party's vice president's tie-breaking vote, Republicans could only afford a net loss of one seat in these elections. The Republicans had a 52-48 majority after the 2016 elections, but they lost a seat in Alabama in December 2017 after Jeff Sessions resigned to become U.S. attorney general and Doug Jones, a Democrat, won in the subsequent special election. Three Republican-held seats were open as a result of retirements in Tennessee, Utah and Arizona. Although every Democratic incumbent ran for re-election, Democrats faced an extremely unfavorable map, defending 26 seats, of which 10 were in states won by Donald Trump in the 2016 presidential election, and five of those where Trump had won by more than ten percent. Republicans, however, only had to defend nine seats, of which only one was in a state won by Hillary Clinton in 2016.

The Republicans increased their majority by defeating Democratic incumbents in Florida, Indiana, Missouri, and North Dakota; and holding the open seats in Tennessee and Utah. In contrast, Democrats won two Republican-held seats, defeating an incumbent in Nevada and winning the open seat in Arizona.

The results for this election cycle were the only significant gains made by the Republicans in what was otherwise characterized as a "blue wave" election. The Republican gains in the Senate and the Democratic gains in the House marked the first mid-term election cycle since 1970 in which the president's party made net gains in one chamber of Congress while suffering net losses in the other, which also occurred in 1914, 1962, and 2022. The 2018 election cycle was the first mid-term election cycle since 2002 in which any incumbents of the non-presidential party lost re-election. The number of defeated non-presidential party incumbents (4) was the most since the 1934 mid-terms. As of 2022, this remains the last election cycle in which the Republican Party won control of the Senate, as well as the last time that the Democrats did not make net gains in the chamber.

Partisan composition 
Among the 33 Class 1 Senate seats up for regular election in 2018, twenty-three were held by Democrats, two by independents who caucused with the Senate Democrats and eight by Republicans. Class Two seats in Minnesota and Mississippi held by interim appointees were also up for election; both incumbent appointees sought election to finish their unexpired terms.

Democrats targeted Republican-held Senate seats in Arizona (open seat) and Nevada. Seats in Texas, Mississippi (at least one of the two seats) and Tennessee (open seat) were also competitive for the Democrats. Republicans targeted Democratic-held seats in Indiana, Missouri, Montana, North Dakota and West Virginia, all of which were won by Republicans in both the 2012 and 2016 presidential elections. Seats in Florida, Ohio, Pennsylvania, Wisconsin and Michigan, all of which were won by Obama in 2008 and 2012 but by Trump in 2016, were also targeted by Republicans. The Democratic-held seat in New Jersey was also considered unexpectedly competitive due to corruption allegations surrounding the Democratic incumbent.

The map was widely characterized as extremely unfavorable to Democrats, as Democrats were defending 26 states while Republicans were defending nine. Of these seats, Democrats were defending ten in states won by Donald Trump in the 2016 presidential election, while Republicans were only defending one seat in a state won by Hillary Clinton in 2016. According to FiveThirtyEight, Democrats faced the most unfavorable Senate map in 2018 that any party has ever faced in any election.

Results summary 

Source: Clerk of the U.S. House of Representatives.

Change in composition 
Each block represents one of the one hundred seats in the Senate. "D#" is a Democratic senator, "I#" is an Independent senator and "R#" is a Republican senator. Arranged so parties are separated and a majority is clear by crossing the middle.

Before the elections 
Each block indicates an incumbent senator's actions going into the election. Some "Ran" for re-election, some "Retired," and those without a note were not up for election this cycle. Before the elections, Republicans held 51 seats, Democrats held 47, and Independents held 2.

After the 2017 Senate special election in Alabama on the start of the second session in the 115th Congress.

After the elections 
Some senators were "Re-elected," some were a "Gain" in the seat from the other party (either by beating an incumbent or by winning an open seat), some were a "Hold" by the same party but with a different senator, and those without a note were not up for election this year.

After these elections, Democrats had 45 seats, independents had 2, and Republicans had 53.

Final pre-election predictions 
Several sites and individuals publish predictions of competitive seats. These predictions look at factors such as the strength of the incumbent (if the incumbent is running for re-election) and the other candidates, and the state's partisan lean (reflected in part by the state's Cook Partisan Voting Index rating). The predictions assign ratings to each seat, indicating the predicted advantage that a party has in winning that seat.

Most election predictors used:
 "tossup": no advantage
 "tilt" (used by some predictors): advantage that is not quite as strong as "lean"
 "lean": slight advantage
 "likely" or "favored": significant, but surmountable, advantage
 "safe" or "solid": near-certain chance of victory

Election dates 
These are the election dates for the regularly scheduled general elections.

Gains and losses

Retirements
Three Republicans retired instead of seeking re-election.

Defeats
Four Democrats and one Republican sought re-election but lost in the general election.

Race summary

Special elections during the preceding Congress 
In these special elections, the winners will be seated before January 3, 2019, when elected and qualified. They are ordered by election date, then by state and by class.

Elections leading to the next Congress 
In these general elections, the winners were elected for the term beginning January 3, 2019.

All of the elections involve the Class 1 seats and they are ordered by state.

Closest races 

In twelve races the margin of victory was under 10% (although in California, the Senate race was fought between two members of the Democratic Party, Dianne Feinstein and Kevin de Leon, because of California's run-off system).

Arizona 

One-term Republican Jeff Flake was elected with 49% of the vote in 2012. He chose not to run for re-election.

U.S. Representative Martha McSally won the Republican nomination in a three-way primary on August 28, 2018, against Joe Arpaio and Kelli Ward.

U.S. Representative Kyrsten Sinema easily secured the Democratic nomination.

Sinema defeated McSally by a slim margin; her victory became official only after six days of counting ballots.

California 

Four-term Democrat Dianne Feinstein won a special election in 1992 and was elected to full terms in 1994, 2000, 2006, and 2012. She ran for re-election and advanced to the general election after securing the top spot in the June 5 jungle primary.

The June 5 primary ballot listed 32 candidates (Feinstein plus 31 challengers) in addition to 3 write-in candidates. There were 10 Democratic candidates, 11 Republican candidates, one Libertarian, one Peace and Freedom candidate, and 9 independent candidates. There was also a Green Party candidate who ran as a write-in.

President pro tempore of the California State Senate Kevin de León advanced to the general election for the right to challenge Feinstein after securing the second spot in the primary.

The 11 Republican candidates who ran in the primary combined for 33.2% of the vote. The top Republican candidate, James P. Bradley, received 8.3% of the vote, which put him in 3rd place at 3.8% behind the second-place finisher, Kevin DeLeon.

On November 6, Dianne Feinstein was elected to a fifth term, defeating Kevin de León.

Connecticut 

One-term Democrat Chris Murphy was elected with 55% of the vote in 2012. He ran for re-election.

Businessmen Matthew Corey received the Republican nomination.

Chris Murphy was elected to a second term, winning nearly 60% of the vote.

Delaware 

Three-term Democrat Tom Carper won re-election with 66% of the vote in 2012. He announced he was running for re-election during an interview on MSNBC on July 24, 2017. He defeated Dover community activist Kerri Evelyn Harris for the Democratic nomination. Sussex County Councilman Robert Arlett won the Republican nomination.

Tom Carper defeated Arlett, winning 60% of the vote.

Florida 

Three-term Democrat Bill Nelson was re-elected with 55% of the vote in 2012. He sought re-election to a fourth term in office.

Florida Governor Rick Scott won the Republican nomination. First elected in 2010 and re-elected in 2014, Scott's term as Governor of Florida was set to end by January 2019, due to term limits.

Edward Janowski was running as an independent, but did not qualify.

Scott led among ballots tallied on election night, but given the close margins of the race recounts were ordered. Final recount numbers were released following a machine and hand recount with Rick Scott maintaining a lead. On November 18, Nelson conceded to Scott. Two days later, election results were certified by the state, cementing Scott's win.

Hawaii 

One-term Democrat Mazie Hirono was elected with 63% of the vote in 2012. She ran.

Ron Curtis was the Republican nominee.

Hirono was elected to a second term by a landslide.

Indiana 

One-term Democrat Joe Donnelly was elected with 50.04% of the vote in 2012. He ran. He won the Democratic primary unopposed.

State Representative Mike Braun won the May 8 Republican primary. U.S. Representatives Luke Messer and Todd Rokita also ran for the Republican nomination.

James Johnson ran as an independent.

Braun won election with 51% of the vote, defeating Joe Donnelly.

Maine 

One-term Independent Senator Angus King was elected in a three-way race with 53% of the vote in 2012. King has caucused with the Democratic Party since taking office in 2013, but he has left open the possibility of caucusing with the Republican Party in the future.

State Senator Eric Brakey ran unopposed for the Republican nomination.

Public school teacher and founder of UClass Zak Ringelstein ran unopposed for the Democratic nomination.

The election was conducted with ranked choice voting, as opposed to "First-past-the-post voting", after Maine voters passed a citizen referendum approving the change in 2016 and a June 2018 referendum sustaining the change.

King was easily re-elected with over 50% of the vote.

Maryland 

Two-term Democrat Ben Cardin was re-elected with 56% of the vote in 2012. He won the Democratic primary.

Tony Campbell, Evan Cronhardt, Nnabu Eze, Gerald Smith, and Blaine Taylor were seeking the Republican nomination, with Campbell winning.

Arvin Vohra, vice chairman of the Libertarian National Committee, sought the Libertarian Party nomination.

Independents Neal Simon and Edward Shlikas, and Michael B Puskar ran.

Cardin won re-election to a third term in office.

Massachusetts 

One-term Democrat Elizabeth Warren was elected with 54% of the vote in 2012. She ran for re-election.

State Representative Geoff Diehl, attorney and founder of Better for America, John Kingston and former Romney aide Beth Lindstrom, ran for the Republican nomination. Diehl won the Republican nomination.

Shiva Ayyadurai ran as an independent. Shiva started as in early 2017 as the first Republican in the race, but went independent in November 2017.

Warren defeated Diehl, winning a second term.

Michigan 

Three-term Democrat Debbie Stabenow was re-elected with 59% of the vote in 2012. She was renominated without Democratic opposition. On the Republican side, businessman John James won the nomination.

In the final months of the election, polls showed the race was beginning to narrow. Ultimately, Stabenow was re-elected, defeating James, with a majority of the vote.

Minnesota

Minnesota (regular) 

Two-term Democrat Amy Klobuchar was re-elected with 65% of the vote in 2012. She ran for re-election.

State Representative Jim Newberger ran for the Republican nomination.

Klobuchar was easily re-elected.

Minnesota (special) 

Two-term Democrat Al Franken announced that he would resign in December 2017, following allegations of sexual harassment. Mark Dayton, Governor of Minnesota, appointed Lt. Gov. Tina Smith on January 2, 2018, as an interim Senator until the November 2018 election. She defeated primary challenger Richard Painter in the Democratic primary held on August 14.

Incumbent Tina Smith defeated Republican Karin Housley in the general election to finish the term ending January 3, 2021.

Mississippi

Mississippi (regular) 

One-term Republican Roger Wicker won re-election with 57% of the vote in 2012. He was appointed in 2007 and won a special election in 2008 to serve the remainder of Trent Lott's term.

David Baria won the Democratic nomination in a run-off on June 26.

Wicker was easily re-elected.

Mississippi (special) 

Seven-term Republican Thad Cochran, who won re-election with 59.9% of the vote in 2014, announced that he would resign since April 1, 2018 due to health reasons. Phil Bryant, Governor of Mississippi, announced on March 21, 2018, that he would appoint Mississippi Agriculture Commissioner Cindy Hyde-Smith to fill the vacancy. She ran in the special election.

On November 6, a nonpartisan jungle primary took place on the same day as the regularly scheduled U.S. Senate election for the seat currently held by Roger Wicker. Party affiliations were not printed on the ballot. As no candidate gained 50% of the votes, a runoff special election between the top two candidates - Hyde-Smith and former United States Secretary of Agriculture Mike Espy - was held on November 27, 2018. Hyde-Smith won the runoff election.

Democrat Tobey Bartee and Republican Chris McDaniel also contested the first round of the election.

Missouri 

Two-term Democrat Claire McCaskill was re-elected with 55% of the vote in 2012. She was renominated.

Attorney General Josh Hawley won the Republican nomination. Japheth Campbell declared his candidacy for the Libertarian nomination.

Polls showed a close race for months leading up to the election. Hawley defeated McCaskill in the general election.

Montana 

Two-term Democrat Jon Tester was re-elected with 49% of the vote in 2012. He won the Democratic nomination in the June 5 primary with no opposition.

State Auditor Matthew Rosendale won the Republican nomination in the June 5 primary. State Senator Albert Olszewski, former judge Russell Fagg, and Troy Downing also ran for the Republican nomination.

Tester was re-elected winning over 50% of the vote.

Nebraska 

One-term Republican Deb Fischer was elected with 58% of the vote in 2012. She ran for and won the Republican nomination in the May 15 primary. Other Republicans who ran include retired professor Jack Heidel, Todd Watson, and Dennis Frank Macek.

Lincoln Councilwoman Jane Raybould ran for and won the Democratic nomination in the May 15 primary. Other Democrats who ran include Frank Svoboda, Chris Janicek, and Larry Marvin, who was a candidate in 2008, 2012, and 2014.

Jim Schultz ran for the Libertarian nomination.

Fischer was easily re-elected.

Nevada 

Incumbent Republican Dean Heller was the Republican nominee. He was appointed to the seat in 2011 and then elected with 46% of the vote in 2012. Heller considered running for governor, but chose to seek re-election.

Nevada was the only state in the mid-term elections that had an incumbent Republican Senator in a state that Hillary Clinton had won in 2016.

Representative Jacky Rosen is the Democratic nominee.

Rosen defeated Heller in the general election, making Heller the only Republican incumbent to lose re-election in 2018.

New Jersey 

Republican Bob Hugin was nominated to face two-term Democrat Bob Menendez, who was re-elected with 59% of the vote in 2012. Menendez was originally appointed to the seat in January 2006. He ran for re-election, despite recent scandals that plagued his campaign.

Hugin self-funded most of his campaign. Ultimately, Menendez was re-elected with nearly 54% of the vote.

New Mexico 

One-term Democrat Martin Heinrich was elected with 51% of the vote in 2012. He ran. Mick Rich won the Republican nomination unopposed.

Aubrey Dunn Jr., New Mexico Commissioner of Public Lands and otherwise the first Libertarian to ever hold statewide elected office in history, announced his run for the seat, but stepped aside in August to allow former Governor of New Mexico, Gary Johnson's candidacy.

Heinrich was easily re-elected, defeating Rich and Johnson.

New York 

One-term Democrat Kirsten Gillibrand was elected with 72% of the vote in 2012. She had previously been appointed to the seat in 2009 and won a special election to remain in office in 2010. She ran.

Private equity executive Chele Chiavacci Farley has been nominated for U.S. Senate by the Republican and Conservative Parties.

Gillibrand was elected to a second term.

North Dakota 

One-term Democrat Heidi Heitkamp was elected with 50% of the vote in 2012. She won the Democratic nomination unopposed.

Representative Kevin Cramer won the Republican nomination in the June 12 primary. Former Niagara, North Dakota Mayor Thomas O'Neill also ran for the Republican nomination.

Heitkamp was continuously behind in the polls leading up to the election, and Heitkamp ended up losing to Cramer by 11%.

Ohio 

Two-term Democrat Sherrod Brown was re-elected with 51% of the vote in 2012. He ran and was unopposed in Democratic primary.

U.S. Representative Jim Renacci ran for and won the Republican nomination in the May 8 primary. Other Republicans who ran include investment banker Michael Gibbons, businesswoman Melissa Ackison, Dan Kiley, and Don Elijah Eckhart.

Brown won re-election, defeating Renacci. Brown was the only non-judicial statewide Democrat in Ohio to win in 2018.

Pennsylvania 

Two-term Democrat Bob Casey Jr. was re-elected with 54% of the vote in 2012. He ran and won the Democratic primary unopposed.

U.S. Representative Lou Barletta ran for and won the Republican nomination in the May 15 primary. Jim Christiana also ran for the Republican nomination.

Casey was easily re-elected.

Rhode Island 

Two-term Democrat Sheldon Whitehouse was re-elected with 64% of the vote in 2012. He ran.

Former Rhode Island Supreme Court Associate Justice Robert Flanders was the Republican nominee.

Whitehouse was elected to a third term by a wide margin.

Tennessee 

Two-term Republican Bob Corker was re-elected with 65% of the vote in 2012. Senator Corker filed his Statement of Candidacy with the Secretary of the U.S. Senate to run for re-election, but on September 26, 2017, Senator Corker announced his intent to retire.

Aaron Pettigrew and Republican U.S. Representative Marsha Blackburn ran for the Republican nomination. Marsha Blackburn became the Republican nominee.

Former Tennessee Governor Phil Bredesen became the Democratic nominee.

Texas 

One-term Republican Ted Cruz was elected with 57% of the vote in 2012. He overwhelmingly won the Republican primary on March 6, 2018.
Television producer Bruce Jacobson, Houston energy attorney Stefano de Stefano, former mayor of La Marque Geraldine Sam, Mary Miller, and Thomas Dillingham were Cruz's opponents.

U.S. Representative Beto O'Rourke won the Democratic nomination on March 6, 2018. Other Democrats who ran include Irasema Ramirez Hernandez and Edward Kimbrough.

Nurse Carl Bible ran as an independent. Bob McNeil ran as the candidate of the American Citizen Party. Neal Dikeman was the Libertarian nominee.

O'Rourke ran a strong campaign, creating a close race in what has traditionally been a Republican stronghold. Nevertheless, Cruz was narrowly re-elected to a second term.

Utah 

Seven-term Republican Orrin Hatch was re-elected with 65% of the vote in 2012. Hatch was the President pro tempore of the United States Senate, as well as the second most-senior Senator. Before the 2012 election, Hatch said that he would retire at the end of his seventh term if he was re-elected. Hatch initially announced his re-election campaign on March 9, 2017, but later announced his plans to retire on January 2, 2018. Former 2012 Republican presidential nominee Mitt Romney was running for the seat.

Professor James Singer was running for the Democratic nomination, but he dropped out and endorsed Salt Lake County Councilwoman Jenny Wilson, who made her Senate bid official on July 17, 2017. Danny Drew also was running, but dropped out and endorsed Jenny Wilson. Mitchell Kent Vice was defeated for the Democratic nomination by Wilson.

Mitt Romney was easily elected, defeating Wilson.

Vermont 

Two-term Independent Senator Bernie Sanders was re-elected with 71% of the vote in 2012. Sanders, one of two independent members of Congress, has caucused with the Democratic Party since taking office in 2007. In November 2015, Sanders announced his plans to run as a Democrat, rather than an Independent, in all future elections. He won the nomination easily.

Sanders easily won election to a third term.

Virginia 

One-term Democrat Tim Kaine was elected with 53% of the vote in 2012. He was re-nominated unopposed. Prince William County Supervisor Corey Stewart was the Republican nominee. Matt Waters was the Libertarian nominee. Kaine defeated Stewart with 57% of the vote. Stewart received 41% of the vote.

Washington 

Three-term Democrat Maria Cantwell was re-elected with 61% of the vote in 2012. She ran.

Washington holds non-partisan blanket primaries, in which the top two finishers advance to the general election regardless of party. Cantwell and former state Republican Party chair Susan Hutchison faced each other in November.

Cantwell won re-election by a large margin.

West Virginia 

One-term Democrat Joe Manchin was elected with 61% of the vote in 2012. He originally won the seat in a 2010 special election. Manchin ran for re-election and won the May 8 Democratic primary. Environmental activist Paula Jean Swearengin, also ran for the Democratic nomination.

West Virginia Attorney General Patrick Morrisey received the Republican nomination in the May 8 primary. Representative Evan Jenkins, coal miner Bo Copley, Jack Newbrough, Don Blankenship, and Tom Willis ran for the Republican nomination.

Despite recent Republican successes in West Virginia, Manchin was able to win re-election to a second term.

Wisconsin 

One-term Democrat Tammy Baldwin was elected with 51% of the vote in 2012. She ran.

State Senator Leah Vukmir and businessman and member of Wisconsin Board of Veterans Affairs Kevin Nicholson ran for the Republican nomination, with Vukmir proceeding to the general election.

Baldwin was re-elected with over 55% of the vote.

Wyoming 

One-term Republican John Barrasso was elected with 76% of the vote in 2012. Barrasso was appointed to the seat in 2007 and won a special election in 2008. He ran.

Gary Trauner, a Jackson Hole businessman and U.S. House candidate in 2006 and 2008, was the Democratic nominee.

Barrasso was easily elected to a second term, defeating Trauner.

See also 
 115th United States Congress 
 116th United States Congress 
 List of new members of the 116th United States Congress
 2018 United States House of Representatives elections
 2018 United States gubernatorial elections

Notes

References